Alpine skiing at the 2015 European Youth Olympic Winter Festival was held between 26–30 January 2015. Boys' and girls' events were held in Malbun, Liechtenstein, while the mixed event was held in St. Gallenkirch, Austria.

Medal summary

Medal table

References
Boys' giant slalom results
Boys' slalom results
Girls' giant slalom results
Girls' slalom results
Mixed parallel team results

2015 European Youth Olympic Winter Festival
European Youth Olympic Winter Festival
Alpine skiing competitions in Austria
2015